Noémie (or Noemie) is a female name of French origin. Uncommon variant spellings in French include Noémi and Noëmie (same pronunciation). It is the French variation of the biblical Hebrew name Naomi, which means "good, pleasant, lovely, and wisdom."

Variants

Notable people named Noémie 
 Noémie Happart (born 1993), Belgian model and beauty pageant, Miss Belgium 2013
 Noémie Lafrance (born 1973), Canadian-born choreographer
 Noémie Lenoir (born 1979), French model and actress
 Noémie Lvovsky (born 1964), French film director, screenwriter and actress
 Noémie Marin (born 1984), Canadian softball and hockey player
 Noémie Merlant (born 1988), French actress and director
 Noémie Nadaud (born 1995), French female acrobatic gymnast
 Noémie Pérugia (born 1903), French soprano
 Noémie Silberer (born 1991), Swiss figure skater

See also 
 Naomi (given name)

References

French feminine given names
Hebrew-language names